Owen's Market was a small chain of grocery stores located in northern Indiana in the United States, owned by the Kroger corporation. Founded in 1938. At the time of the chain name's phase-out in August 2020, there were three Owen's Market locations in the Indiana communities of Huntington, Ligonier and Warsaw. On August 17, 2020, Owen's website became a redirect to kroger.com, and the three stores were rebranded as Kroger the same week, marking the end of the Owen's name.

References

External links
Owen's Market homepage
The Kroger Company

Kroger
Retail companies established in 1938
Defunct supermarkets of the United States
Companies based in Indiana